Karl Ludwig August Friedrich von Phull (or Pfuel) (6 November 1757 – 25 April 1826) was a German general in the service of the Kingdom of Prussia and the Russian Empire. Phull served as Chief of the General Staff of King Frederick William III of Prussia in the Battle of Jena-Auerstedt. While in Russian service, he successfully advocated for a scorched earth policy during Napoleon's invasion of Russia.

Family

Phull was born in Ludwigsburg to the Württemberg-line of the Pfuel family of Brandenburg. He was the son of the Swabian general Carl Ludwig Wilhelm August von Phull (1723–1793) and Auguste Wilhelmine von Keßlau (1734–1768).

Phull's first marriage was in Potsdam on 2 May 1790 to Henriette Luise Charlotte von Beguelin (1763–1810), but they divorced in 1800. They had one daughter, Emilie Hernriette (1792–1864). Phull remarried on 18 September 1801 to Charlotte Poths (1766–1808), but this second marriage ended in 1803. Phull and Poths had one son, Eugen (1801–1857). Phull married for a third time in Berlin on 4 October 1810 to Sabine Henriette von Wedel (ca. 1773–1840), but this marriage also ended in separation.

Career

Phull entered the Prussian Army in 1777, serving near King Frederick II and becoming a member of the Prussian General Staff in 1781. Having participated in the Rhine campaign of 1793 in the First Coalition, he was promoted to Oberst in 1798 and Generalmajor in 1805. As the Departementschef of the General Staff since 1804, he was Frederick William III's chief of staff during the Battle of Jena-Auerstedt in 1806.

As a result of the Prussian collapse in the Fourth Coalition, Frederick William sent Phull to serve Tsar Alexander I of Russia. Phull won the confidence of the Russian emperor, was promoted to major general in the Russian Army, and instructed Alexander in military strategy. In 1809, Phull was promoted to lieutenant general.

It is disputed how involved Phull was in the Russian decision to adopt a scorched earth policy during Napoleon's invasion of Russia. After Napoleon took Moscow on 14 September 1812, Phull was denounced by many Russian officers. He had 
to flee through Sweden to Britain. But the merits of his advice were later recognized. In a letter to Phull on 12 December 1813, Tsar Alexander wrote "C'est vous qui avez conçu le plan qui, avec l'aide de la providence, a eu pour suite le salut de la Russie et celui de l'Europe." ("It is you who conceived the plan which, with the help of Providence, had as a result the salvation of Russia and that of Europe").

In 1813, Phull advised Prince Frederik of the Netherlands in The Hague. After the fall of Paris in 1814, Phull was named Russian ambassador in The Hague and Brussels; his witty third wife, Sabine Henriette von Wedel, headed a popular household in Brussels. After Sabine became emotionally unstable, Phull retired to Stuttgart in 1821, where he died five years later.

Phull's involvement with the Russian campaign in 1812 is included in Leo Tolstoy's War and Peace, in which the general is known as Pfuel.

Notes

ReferencesAllgemeine Deutsche Biographie'' (ADB). Bd. 26, Leipzig 1888

1757 births
1826 deaths
Prussian nobility
Prussian commanders of the Napoleonic Wars
Russian people of German descent
People from Ludwigsburg
People from the Duchy of Württemberg
Russian commanders of the Napoleonic Wars
German military leaders of the French Revolutionary Wars
French invasion of Russia
Recipients of the Pour le Mérite (military class)
Military personnel from Baden-Württemberg